Véronique Linster (born 13 July 1968) is a Luxembourgian hurdler. She competed in the women's 100 metres hurdles at the 1996 Summer Olympics.

International competitions

References

1968 births
Living people
Athletes (track and field) at the 1996 Summer Olympics
Luxembourgian female hurdlers
Olympic athletes of Luxembourg
World Athletics Championships athletes for Luxembourg
Sportspeople from Luxembourg City